Cillian McDaid (born 14 August 1997) is an Irish Gaelic footballer for Monivea Abbey and Galway.

Career
He played Australian rules football with Carlton. He had a two-year professional contract which ended in 2018.

He scored a goal and two points in the 2022 All-Ireland quarter-final between Armagh and Galway at Croke Park. He was the man of the match. He scored the second goal for Galway in the game. He was voted Footballer of the Week on the GAA.ie website. He also won an All Star that year.

He also played hurling for Craughwell and won an All-Ireland Minor Hurling Championship with Galway in 2015.

Honours
Galway
 Connacht Senior Football Championship (1): 2022

Individual
 The Sunday Game Team of the Year (1): 2022
 PwC GAA/GPA Player of the Month Award: June 2022
 All Star (1): 2022

References

External links
 Cillian McDaid pointing way for Galway as he puts injury hell behind him

Living people
All Stars Awards winners (football)
Craughwell hurlers
Dual players
Gaelic footballers who switched code
Galway inter-county Gaelic footballers
Monivea Abbey Gaelic footballers
1997 births